Out of Time is a 1988 science fiction film directed by Robert Butler and starring Bruce Abbott and Bill Maher. It was a failed television pilot made into a  television movie.

Plot
A cop from the year 2088 (Abbott) is transported back to 1988 while pursuing a criminal attempting to flee in a time machine, and enlists the aid of his legendary great-grandfather (Maher) in pursuing the crook. However, he finds that his grandfather is not yet the great cop hero/inventor who is revered  in the future. Abbott must catch the criminal and help shape his grandfather into the man history recorded.

Cast
Bruce Abbott as Channing Taylor 
Bill Maher as Maxwell Taylor 
Rebecca Schaeffer as Pam Wallace 
Kristian Alfonso as Cassandra Barber 
Leo Rossi as Ed Hawkins 
Ray Girardin as Capt. Krones 
Adam Ant as Richard Marcus 
Arva Holt as Capt. Stuart 
Tom La Grua as Frank 
Barbara Tarbuck as Dr. Kerry Langdon

References

Sources
TV Guide magazine 
Article from Lansing State Journal newspaper of July 14, 1988. 
IMDb movies website

External links

1988 films
1980s science fiction films
1980s English-language films
American science fiction television films
Films about time travel
Films directed by Robert Butler
Films set in 2088
Television pilots not picked up as a series
1980s American films